Pedro Luis Sporleder (born 2 January 1971 in Buenos Aires) is a former rugby union footballer and currently businessman from Argentina.
He played for the Argentina national rugby union team (Argentina) on 77 occasions, scoring 12 tries.
He represented "Los Pumas" at a record four Rugby World Cup tournaments in 1991, 1995, 1999 and 2003.

Sporleder played his club rugby for Curupaytí in Argentina until 2007, year of his retirement.

Apart from rugby, he runs a Big Real Estate Company in Punta del Este, Uruguay "X Group" ( www.pueblomio.com.uy )

References

External links
 Scrum profile
 1999 Rugby World Cup
 2003 RWC profile
 Key player: Pedro Sporleder
 La16 profile
 Pedro Sporleder en Siuxy Sports

1971 births
Living people
Rugby union players from Buenos Aires
Argentine rugby union players
Rugby union locks
Argentine people of German descent
Argentine businesspeople
Argentina international rugby union players